Guillermo Pérez Roldán was the defending champion, but lost in the quarterfinals this year.

Andrei Chesnokov won the title, defeating Martin Střelba, 5–7, 7–6, 6–2 in the final.

Seeds

Draw

Finals

Top half

Section 1

Section 2

Bottom half

Section 3

Section 4

External links
 Main draw

1989 Grand Prix (tennis)
1989 BMW Open